Amanda Clara Thompson (born November 18, 1987) is an American professional basketball player who played for the Atlanta Dream of the WNBA. She had previously played college basketball for the University of Oklahoma before being drafted by the Tulsa Shock in the 2010 WNBA draft.

Oklahoma  statistics
Source

References

External links
 Player profile
 Oklahoma Sooners bio

1987 births
Living people
American women's basketball players
Atlanta Dream players
Oklahoma Sooners women's basketball players
Parade High School All-Americans (girls' basketball)
Tulsa Shock draft picks
Tulsa Shock players
Whitney M. Young Magnet High School alumni
Forwards (basketball)